Francis Tulikimoana Maka (born May 10, 1985) is an American football linebacker who is currently a free agent. He was signed by the Spokane Shock as an undrafted free agent in 2011. He played college football at University of Hawaii at Manoa.

References

External links
Hawai'i Bio
Arena Football League bio

1985 births
Living people
American football linebackers
College of the Sequoias Giants football players
Hawaii Rainbow Warriors football players
Arkansas Diamonds players
Spokane Shock players
San Jose SaberCats players
People from Hillsborough, California